"Stuck in a Dream" is a song by American rapper Lil Mosey. It was released on September 17, 2019, as the second single from his second studio album Certified Hitmaker. The song features vocals from American rapper Gunna and production from Royce David. The single peaked at number 62 on the US Billboard Hot 100, becoming Mosey's highest-charting single until it was surpassed by "Blueberry Faygo". It has gone on to become one of Mosey's most popular songs, as well as his third most streamed song on Spotify, behind "Noticed" and "Blueberry Faygo".

Background and composition 
The song was originally written in 2018 and leaked on August 26, 2019, with no guest appearances. The lyrics of the song address the lifestyles of Lil Mosey and Gunna. The former talks about his drug usage, which he later addressed in an interview with Genius. According to Mosey, the song is also about him living in his dream of his career.

Music video 
The music video was released along with the single on September 17, 2019. Directed by Michael Garcia, the video shows Lil Mosey and Gunna in a neon-lit dream world, and takes place in a location called the "Pink Motel". The rappers show off their money and "iced out" jewelry with women surrounding them. The music video has amassed over 45 million views to date.

Charts

Certifications

References 

2019 singles
2019 songs
Lil Mosey songs
Gunna (rapper) songs
Songs written by Gunna (rapper)
Interscope Records singles